Weimar II is an electoral constituency (German: Wahlkreis) represented in the Landtag of Thuringia. It elects one member via first-past-the-post voting. Under the current constituency numbering system, it is designated as constituency 32. It covers most of the city of Weimar.

Weimar II was created for the 1994 state election. Originally named just Weimar, it was renamed before the 2014 election after a small part of the city of Weimar was transferred to Weimar I – Weimarer Land II. Since 2019, it has been represented by Steffen Dittes of The Left.

Geography
As of the 2019 state election, Weimar II covers most of the city of Weimar, specifically the city districts (Ortsteile) of Ettersberg-Siedlung, Gaberndorf, Gelmeroda, Innenstadt, Legefeld/Holzdorf, Niedergrunstedt, Nördliche Innenstadt, Nordstadt, Oberweimar/Ehringsdorf, Possendorf, Südstadt, Südweststadt, Taubach, Tröbsdorf, Weimar-Nord, and Weimar-West.

Members
The constituency was held by the Christian Democratic Union (CDU) from its creation in 1994 until 2009, during which time it was represented by Frank-Michael Pietzsch (1994–2004) and Peter D. Krause (2004–2009). It was won by The Left in 2009, and represented by Thomas Hartung, who defected to the Social Democratic Party (SPD) in 2010 and served the remainder of his term as a member of that party. The CDU's candidate Jörg Geibert regained the constituency in 2014. It was again won by The Left in 2019, and is represented by Steffen Dittes.

Election results

2019 election

2014 election

2009 election

2004 election

1999 election

1994 election

Notes

References

Electoral districts in Thuringia
1994 establishments in Germany
Weimar
Constituencies established in 1994